Sarthak Sardana (born 24 July 1988), better known by his stage name Sartek, is an Indian DJ and music producer.

Career 
He is the first Indian DJ on Hardwell's Revealed Recordings and to have all the releases on Beatport Top 100 charts. He was also the opening act for Justin Bieber, Armin Van Buuren, Martin Garrix, Steve Aoki, Axwell, Nicky Romero and others during their India tour.

Sartek has also had releases on international record labels such as Armada Music and Sony Music.

Personal life
Sartek is a New Delhi native whose past preference of choice of career was becoming a Chartered accountant, for which he passed the main examinations. He has formerly served in corporations before pursuing music professionally and full-time.

Discography

Singles

As lead artist

References

Living people
Indian DJs
1988 births
Indian record producers
Revealed Recordings artists